Mohammed Dada Nabeel (born 1989) is an Indian football player. He is currently playing for Mohun Bagan A.C. in the I-League in India as a striker.

Career
Nabeel, son of former BEML coach Dada Peer, came into spotlight after playing in the India Under-19 team under Colm Toal. He was then roped in by HAL where he first played in the I-League. It was from HAL that Nabeel joined Air India FC in 2009.

Dada played for Air India FC before joining Salgaocar.

Career statistics

Club

References

External links
 Dada Nabeel at Goal.com

Indian footballers
1989 births
Living people
I-League players
Footballers from Bangalore
Hindustan Aeronautics Limited S.C. players
Air India FC players
Salgaocar FC players
India youth international footballers
Association football forwards